Fadwa Souleimane (also transcribed as Fadwa Soliman or Fadwa Suleiman; 17 May 1970 – 17 August 2017) was a Syrian actress of Alawite descent who led a Sunni-majority protest against Bashar al-Assad's government in Homs. She became one of the most recognized faces of the Syrian Civil War.

Acting career
Born in Aleppo, Soliman moved to the capital Damascus to pursue an acting career where she performed in numerous plays, Maria's Voice and Media, and in at least a dozen TV shows, including in The Diary of Abou Antar and Little Ladies. She also played an art teacher at an orphanage in "Small Hearts," a television series that helped raise awareness about human organ trafficking and was broadcast by several Arab channels. She also acted in an Arabic adaptation of Henrik Ibsen's "A Doll's House" at the Qabbani theater in Damascus.

Role in Syrian uprising
At the start of the Syrian uprising in 2011, Soliman was one of the few outspoken actresses to protest against the government of Syrian President Bashar Al-Assad. Facing possible death or imprisonment, Soliman wanted to participate in the demonstration to dispel what she said was public perception that all in the Alawite community, which comprised around 10 percent of the Syrian population, supported the government of fellow Alawite Bashar al-Assad. She also wanted to dismiss the government's narrative that those who participated in protests were either Islamists or armed terrorists. She appeared at rallies demanding Assad's removal, sharing the podium with soccer star Abdel Basset Al-Sarout, one of a number of other prominent Syrians who backed the revolt.

Soliman also delivered impassioned monologues to camera, calling for peaceful protests to continue across the country until Assad was overthrown. “Sectarian violence in Homs would be worse if it weren’t for Fadwa Soliman,” says Peter Harling, Syria analyst at the International Crisis Group, the think tank. “She has tried to contain the damage among Alawites who have been hijacked by the regime.”

In one video message in 2011, Soliman said security forces were searching Homs neighborhoods for her, and beating people to force them to reveal her hiding place. She cut her hair short like a boy, and moved from house to house to evade capture. In 2012, she fled with her husband via Lebanon and moved to France, where they resided in Paris.

Death
On August 17, 2017, Soliman died of cancer in exile in Paris, aged 47.

Filmography

Dubbing roles
 Inazuma Eleven  (season 1 only) - Mamoru Endou 
 Hamtaro   (season 4 only) - Bijou, Howdy, Kana Iwata
 Battle B-Daman - Yamato Daiwa
 Battle B-Daman: Fire Spirits! - Yamato Daiwa
 The Story of Cinderella - Jeanne, Bingo (1st dub)
 Tom & Jerry Kids - Jerry Mouse
 Naruto - Inari
 Monster Rancher - Genki Sakura
 Secret of Cerulean Sand - William F. Buxton/Harry Killer, Sabri, Bunch
 What-a-Mess - What-a-Mess
 The Marshmallow Times - Clove
 Ojamajo Doremi - Dela
 The Spooktacular New Adventures of Casper - Kathleen "Kat" Harvey (Venus Centre version)
 Casper's Scare School - Mantha (Venus Centre version)
 Anime Himitsu no Hanazono - Mary Lennox (1st dub)
 Cyborg Kuro-chan - Kuro (2nd voice) (Venus Centre version)
 Grander Musashi - Mio Hoshiyama
 Bomberman B-Daman Bakugaiden - White Bomber/Bomberman
 Digimon Adventure - Sora Takenouchi, Patamon, Tokomon, Angemon, Vamdemon, Natsuko Takaishi, Gazimon (one of three)
 Digimon Adventure 02 - Iori Hida, Sora Takenouchi, Patamon, Tokomon, Angemon, Gekomon, Ken Ichijouji (Young), Michael Washington, Jun Motomiya, Kae Izumi, HolyAngemon, Natsuko Takaishi
 Baby & Me - Tadashi Gotoh, Hiroko "Hiro" Gotoh
 Bakusō Kyōdai Let's & Go!! - Gō Seiba (Venus Center version)
 Bakusō Kyōdai Let's & Go!! Max - Gō Seiba, Hitoshi Matsu
 Pokémon - Officer Jenny (1st voice), Tommy
 Sonic the Hedgehog (SatAM) - Sonic the Hedgehog
 Sonic X - Sonic the Hedgehog, Shadow the Hedgehog
 Astro Boy - Astro Boy
 Emily of New Moon - Perry Miller (1st voice), Aileen Kent (1st voice), Narration
 Little Women II: Jo's Boys - Josephine "Jo" Bhaer (Venus Center version)
 The Great Book of Nature (Venus Centre version)
 The Pink Panther (Venus Centre version)
 Space Warrior Baldios
 Charley and Mimmo (Venus Centre version)
 Bartok the Magnificent - Piloff
 Animaniacs - Colin, Katie Ka-Boom
 Hunter × Hunter - Old Lady Quizzer
 Dennō Bōkenki Webdiver - Charon
 Babar - Pom (Venus Centre version)
 Rainbow Fish - Rainbow Fish (Venus Centre version)
 Hi no Ame ga Furu - Shizu
 Detective Conan - Ayako Suzuki, Reiko Saeki, Kaori Nakahara
 The Fantastic Voyages of Sinbad the Sailor - Sawar
 Tommy & Oscar - Girl (Venus Centre version)
 Nobody's Boy: Remi - Rémi Barberin (Venus Centre version)
 Get Ed - Ed, the Protector
 Ushiro no Shoumen Daare
 Mr. Seguin's Goat - White Goat (1st dub)
  -

References

External links

1970 births
2017 deaths
Syrian television actresses
Syrian Alawites
Syrian stage actresses
Syrian voice actresses
People from Aleppo
Syrian voice directors
Syrian exiles
Syrian dissidents